Valery Aleksandrovich Korobkin (born 2 July 1984) is a Kazakhstani retired professional football player of Russian descent.

Career

Club
Following the conclusion of the 2015 season, Korobkin was transfer listed by Aktobe. In January 2016, Korobkin signed for FC Atyrau.
On 26 January 2017, Korobkin signed for FC Kaisar.

At the end of 2019, 35-year old Korobkin decided to retire. However, the announcement came in January 2020.

Honours
Aktobe
Kazakhstan Super Cup (1): 2014

References

External links
 Career summary at KLISF
 
 

1984 births
Living people
Russian footballers
Kazakhstani footballers
Kazakhstan international footballers
Kazakhstani people of Russian descent
Kazakhstan Premier League players
FC Energiya Volzhsky players
FC Rotor Volgograd players
FC SKA Rostov-on-Don players
FC Salyut Belgorod players
FC Astana players
FC Aktobe players
FC Atyrau players
Association football midfielders
FC Yenisey Krasnoyarsk players
Sportspeople from Volgograd